Ann Harrison (September 24, 1944 – April 20, 2001) was the recipient of the world's first successful human double lung transplant.  She survived for almost fifteen years after the surgery and died of unrelated causes.

Operation
Harrison suffered from end-stage emphysema and thoracic surgeon Joel D. Cooper had told her that without surgery, she had only a few months to live. The operation was performed at Toronto General Hospital on November 26, 1986, when she received the lungs of an 18-year-old Kingston, Ontario, native who had recently died in a car accident.  Cooper had previously successfully performed a single lung transplant on pulmonary fibrosis victim Tom Hall on November 7, 1983, but this was the first successful double lung transplant.

Death
Ann Harrison died aged 56 at Toronto General Hospital on April 20, 2001, of a brain aneurysm unrelated to her operation.  She was the world's longest surviving double-lung recipient until her 15-year record was broken in 2005 by cystic fibrosis patient Howell Graham of Wilmington, North Carolina.

Her surgeon Dr Joel Cooper in a eulogy said of her, "Ann began a new era, one that has brought immense relief to emphysema patients. Having received this gift, she became a den mother for so many other patients, encouraging them in their quest, celebrating with them their victories, and consoling them and their families in their losses."  Dr Cooper shows a picture of Ann Harrison every time he lectures on transplantation and says, "I still marvel when someone so close to death is returned to a vigorous life."

References

External links
 Fact Sheet for the Lung Transplant Program at Toronto General Hospital, University Health Network PDF

1944 births
2001 deaths
People from Toronto
Lung transplant recipients
Deaths from intracranial aneurysm